Amadou is the Francophonic-orthography variant of the Islamic name Ahmad, commonly used in West Africa. Amadou is interchangeable with the forms Ahmadu or Amadu in non-Francophone African countries.

Notable people with the name include:

Given name
Amadou Aboubakar Zaki (born 1988), Nigerien basketball player
Amadou Alassane (born 1983), French footballer
Amadou Ali (born 1943), Cameroonian politician
Amadou Ali Djibo, Nigerien politician

 Amadou Ba (disambiguation), several people 
Amadou Bagayoko (born 1954), half of Mali singing duo Amadou & Mariam
Amadou Bakayoko (born 1996), Sierra Leonean-English professional footballer
Amadou Bamba (1853–1927), Muslim Sufi religious leader in Senegal
Amadou Cissé (born 1948), Nigerien politician
Amadou Cissé Dia (1915–2002), Senegalese politician and playwright
Amadou Cissé (footballer) (born 1985), French-Guinean footballer
Amadou Cheiffou (born 1942), Nigerien politician
Amadou Coulibaly (born 1984), Burkinabé footballer
Amadou Gon Coulibaly (1959–2020), Prime Minister of Ivory Coast
Amadou Dia Ba (born 1958), Senegalese Olympic athlete
Amadou Diallo (1975–1999), Guinean immigrant killed in a New York police shooting
Amadou Diamouténé (born 1985), Malian footballer
Amadou Diawara (born 1997), Guinean professional footballer
Amadou Doucoure (1919–1971), Malian politician
Amadou Gakou (born 1940), Senegalese Olympic sprinter
Amadou Hampâté Bâ (1901–1991), Malian writer and ethnologist
Amadou Jawo (born 1984), Swedish-Gambian footballer
Amadou Karim Gaye (1913–2000), Senegalese veterinarian, physician and politician
Amadou Konare, Malian coup leader
Amadou Koné (born 1953), Burkinabé writer
Amadou Konte (born 1981), Malian-French footballer
Amadou Lamine Ba, Senegalese ambassador to the United States
Amadou Ly, Senegalese-American actor
Amadou Mahtar Ba, African media executive
Amadou-Mahtar M'Bow (born 1921), Senegalese educator
Amadou Meïté (1949–2014), Ivorian sprinter
Amadou Morou (born 1983), Togolese footballer
Amadou Moutari (born 1994), Nigerien footballer
Amadou Ouattara (born 1989), Ivorian footballer
Amadou Rabihou (born 1984), Cameroonian footballer
Amadou Salifou, Nigerien politician
Amadou Samb (born 1988), Senegalese footballer
Amadou Sanogo (born 1972), Malian military officer and coup leader
Amadou Sanokho (born 1979), French footballer
Amadou Sanyang (born 1991), Gambian footballer
Amadou Scattred Janneh (born 1963), Gambian-American politician
Amadou Séré (born 1987), Burkinabé footballer
Amadou Sidibé (born 1986), Malian footballer
Amadou Soukouna (born 1992), French footballer
Amadou Tidiane Tall (born 1975), Burkinabé footballer
Amadou Touré, Burkinabé footballer
Amadou Tidiane Tall, Burkinabé footballer
Amadou Toumani Touré (born 1948), President of Mali from 2002 to 2012

Surname 
Anne-Lisa Amadou (1930–2002), Norwegian literary researcher
Hama Amadou (born 1950), Prime Minister of Niger from 1995 to 1996 and from 2000 to 2007
Ibrahim Amadou (born 1993), Cameroonian footballer
Kader Amadou (born 1989), Nigerien footballer
Moudachirou Amadou (born 1971), Beninese footballer

See also
Amadou, a substance prepared from bracket fungi

Surnames of Nigerien origin